Henryk Budziński (29 November 1904 – 18 March 1983) was a Polish rower who competed in the 1932 Summer Olympics.

In 1932 he won the bronze medal with his partner Jan Mikołajczak in the coxless pair event. He was born in Bobryk, Belarus and died in Gdańsk.

References

External links
 profile 

1904 births
1983 deaths
Polish male rowers
Olympic rowers of Poland
Rowers at the 1932 Summer Olympics
Olympic bronze medalists for Poland
Olympic medalists in rowing
People from Baranavichy District
People from Novogrudsky Uyezd
Medalists at the 1932 Summer Olympics
European Rowing Championships medalists